Orsolobidae is a six-eyed spider family with about 180 described species in thirty genera. It was first described by J. A. L. Cooke in 1965, and was raised to family status from "Dysderidae" in 1985.

Genera

Most genera are endemic to New Zealand and the Australian region, but several genera occur in southern Africa and South America. , the World Spider Catalog accepts the following genera:

Afrilobus Griswold & Platnick, 1987 — South Africa, Malawi
Anopsolobus Forster & Platnick, 1985 — New Zealand
Ascuta Forster, 1956 — New Zealand
Australobus Forster & Platnick, 1985 — Australia
Azanialobus Griswold & Platnick, 1987 — South Africa
Basibulbus Ott, Platnick, Berniker & Bonaldo, 2013
Bealeyia Forster & Platnick, 1985 — New Zealand
Calculus Purcell, 1910 — South Africa
Chileolobus Forster & Platnick, 1985 — Chile
Cornifalx Hickman, 1979 — Australia
Dugdalea Forster & Platnick, 1985 — New Zealand
Duripelta Forster, 1956 — New Zealand
Falklandia Forster & Platnick, 1985 — Falkland Is.
Hickmanolobus Forster & Platnick, 1985 — Australia
Losdolobus Platnick & Brescovit, 1994 — Argentina, Brazil
Mallecolobus Forster & Platnick, 1985 — Chile
Maoriata Forster & Platnick, 1985 — New Zealand
Orongia Forster & Platnick, 1985 — New Zealand
Orsolobus Simon, 1893 — Chile, Argentina
Osornolobus Forster & Platnick, 1985 — Chile
Paralobus Forster & Platnick, 1985 — New Zealand
Pounamuella Forster & Platnick, 1985 — New Zealand
Subantarctia Forster, 1955 — New Zealand
Tangata Forster & Platnick, 1985 — New Zealand
Tasmanoonops Hickman, 1930 — Australia
Tautukua Forster & Platnick, 1985 — New Zealand
Turretia Forster & Platnick, 1985 — New Zealand
Waiporia Forster & Platnick, 1985 — New Zealand
Waipoua Forster & Platnick, 1985 — New Zealand
Wiltonia Forster & Platnick, 1985 — New Zealand

See also
 List of Orsolobidae species

References

External links

 
Araneomorphae families